Hebeloma sordidum is a species of mushroom in the family Hymenogastraceae.

sordidum
Fungi of Europe